Leandro De Bortoli (born 3 August 1988) is an Argentine professional footballer who plays as a goalkeeper for Dock Sud.

Career
De Bortoli started his career with Temperley. For the 2012–13 season, De Bortoli was sent out on loan to Torneo Argentino A's Unión Mar del Plata. He made fifteen appearances for Unión Mar del Plata. He returned to Temperley in 2013 and was subsequently an unused substitute on twenty-three occasions, before making his professional debut in the Argentine Primera División, following back-to-back promotions, on 4 May 2015 against San Martín. After six seasons in the first-team, De Bortoli had featured seventeen times in all competitions. Instituto completed the signing of De Bortoli in July 2018.

After just two appearances for Instituto in one season, the goalkeeper departed at the end of his contract on 30 June 2019. On 29 February 2020, having been without a club since his release, De Bortoli joined Primera C Metropolitana's Dock Sud as an injury replacement for Juan Arias Navarro. He made his debut on 6 March in the Copa Argentina, as they eliminated Primera División outfit Unión Santa Fe on penalties; he saved two spot-kicks.

Career statistics
.

References

External links

1988 births
Living people
Sportspeople from Avellaneda
Argentine footballers
Association football goalkeepers
Primera B Metropolitana players
Primera Nacional players
Argentine Primera División players
Torneo Argentino A players
Primera C Metropolitana players
Club Atlético Temperley footballers
Unión de Mar del Plata footballers
Instituto footballers
Sportivo Dock Sud players